Novík was a destroyer of the Russian Imperial Navy and Soviet Navy, commissioned in 1913 where she served with the Baltic Fleet during World War I. She joined the Bolsheviks in November 1917 and was renamed Yakov Sverdlov in 1923. She was a training ship when Operation Barbarossa began, but was recalled to active duty the following day. She struck a mine on 28 August 1941 and sank while escorting an evacuation convoy during the Soviet evacuation of Tallinn.

Construction
The first ship of its class, Novik was completed in 1910 at the Putilovsky Plant. She was originally designed by AG Vulcan Stettin. The class included 52 other ships in four groups:

 

Novik was one of the best ships of the type during the First World War. Novik -class ships were the first destroyers to be powered by oil instead of coal. When first commissioned she was the fastest ship in the world.

World War I
During the night of 6/7 May 1915 Novik, in company with ten other destroyers, mined the approaches to the port of Liepāja which was being attacked by the Germans. There was an inconclusive encounter between cruisers of the Russian covering force and the German light cruiser , but the destroyers were undetected. One of the mines laid that night blew off the bow of the new  when she entered Liepāja on the morning of 8 May and rendered her unrepairable. Novik escorted the armored cruiser  on a mission to shell the German port of Memel, but they became separated from the rest of the force in heavy fog and encountered the German armored cruiser . Rurik opened fire, but was soon forced to turn away by a (false) submarine contact and lost sight of the Germans. V 99 struck two mines while attempting to break out of the Gulf and was sunk. During the night of 19/20 November 1915 Novik led seven Russian destroyers to attack German patrols off Windau. They sank the auxiliary patrol boat Norburg and escaped before German reinforcements could arrive. On the night of 13 May 1916, she led two of her half-sisters in search of German iron ore convoys sailing along the Swedish coast. They found a convoy of ten freighters escorted by four auxiliary patrol boats near Häfringe Island. The freighters fled for Swedish waters while the escorts turned to engage the Russians. The Russians sank the auxiliary cruiser Hermann, even though they refused to close the escorts believing them to be far stronger than they actually were, but the freighters escaped and no other damage was inflicted. On 26 June 1916, She ran aground off Naissaar. She was refloated with assistance from the Russian icebreaker Petr Veliky, which towed her in to Helsinki, Grand Duchy of Finland. Repairs took until 13 August to complete.

On 26 October 1917 Noviks crew joined the Bolsheviks, although nothing is known of her activities, if any, under their control during World War I.

Rebuilding
She was laid up from 9 September 1918 until 1925 when she was extensively rebuilt between 26 September 1925 and 30 August 1929. Her rearmost set of twin torpedo tubes was removed, the three  guns on the quarterdeck were moved forward and a  "Lender" anti-aircraft gun was mounted at the very rear of the quarterdeck, which seriously obscured the arc of fire of the rear 102 mm gun. The three remaining twin sets of torpedo tubes were exchanged for triple launchers and re-positioned, a net increase of one torpedo tube. The bridge structure was enlarged and the deckhouse immediately aft of the fourth funnel was removed and a new, larger deckhouse was added about  aft of the fourth funnel.

She was overhauled between 28 November 1937 and 8 December 1940, although what exactly this involved is not clear. She probably had her machinery overhauled or replaced and between two and four single  21-K anti-aircraft guns were installed. Before her refit was completed, however, she was re-designated as a training ship on 23 April 1940.

World War II
At the start of the war, she was reassigned to the Third Destroyer Division of the Baltic Fleet. During the evacuation of the Soviet Navy from Tallinn to Kronstadt during Operation Barbarossa, Yakov Sverdlov was assigned as an escort to the flagship . During the operation, she hit a mine and sank near Cape Juminda on 28 August 1941.

Notes

Bibliography

External links

 Yakov Sverdlov on sovnavy-ww2.by.ru 
 Yakov Sverdlov on navsource.narod.ru  

Destroyers of the Imperial Russian Navy
Ships built in Saint Petersburg
1911 ships
Maritime incidents in 1916
World War I destroyers of Russia
Maritime incidents in August 1941